The 2003–04 Northern Counties East Football League season was the 22nd in the history of Northern Counties East Football League, a football competition in England.

Premier Division

The Premier Division featured 18 clubs which competed in the previous season, along with two new clubs:
Eastwood Town, relegated from the Northern Premier League
Mickleover Sports, promoted from Division One

League table

Division One

Division One featured 14 clubs which competed in the previous season, along with four new clubs.
Clubs joined from the Central Midlands League:
Carlton Town
South Normanton Athletic
Sutton Town

Plus:
Garforth Town, relegated from the Premier Division

League table

References

External links
 Northern Counties East Football League

2003-04
8